Sambu (also known as Sambo or Sambos) was one of the traditional independent Ovimbundu kingdoms in Angola.

References

African civilizations